Deanna Rose Cooper (born 20 June 1993) is an English professional footballer who plays as a defender for Reading. She previously played for Gillingham, Brighton & Hove Albion, London Bees and Chelsea.

Football career

Club

London Bees
Cooper played for London Bees during the 2016 FA WSL season. Playing primarily as a centreback defender, she scored 1 goal in her 11 appearances for the club.  During the first round of the 2016 FA WSL Cup, she scored an equaliser against former champions Chelsea which resulted in a penalty shootout and win for the Bees.

Chelsea
Cooper signed with Chelsea in February 2017. Of her signing, she said, "It is a dream of mine to join a pro club so to be here is an amazing feeling. I have worked my way through the ranks and am delighted to have done enough to earn a contract with Chelsea."  Cooper was a starting defender in 8 of the 11 matches in the FA WSL Spring Series, helping the team win with a  record.

Ahead of the 2017–18 season, she experienced an ACL injury. In March 2018, she signed a two-year extension with Chelsea.

Reading
On 17 July 2020, Reading announced the signing of Cooper. On 7 July 2022, Reading announced that Cooper had signed a new two-year contract with the club.

Career statistics

Honours

Club
Chelsea
FA WSL: 2017, 2019-20
FA Women's League Cup: 2019-20

Cricket career
Cooper played cricket for Kent between 2008 and 2016, playing as a right-arm medium bowler and right-handed batter. She also played for England Academy and in the Super Fours. She retired from cricket after sustaining an injury.

References

External links

 
 Chelsea profile
 

1993 births
Living people
Sportspeople from Chatham, Kent
Women's association football fullbacks
English women's footballers
Women's Super League players
Chelsea F.C. Women players
London Bees players
Brighton & Hove Albion W.F.C. players
Gillingham L.F.C. players
Kent women cricketers